Events from the year 1720 in Scotland.

Incumbents 

 Secretary of State for Scotland: The Duke of Roxburghe

Law officers 
 Lord Advocate – Sir David Dalrymple, 1st Baronet, then Robert Dundas
 Solicitor General for Scotland – Robert Dundas, then Walter Stewart

Judiciary 
 Lord President of the Court of Session – Lord North Berwick
 Lord Justice General – Lord Ilay
 Lord Justice Clerk – Lord Grange

Events 
 A great storm cuts Rattray, Aberdeenshire, off from the open sea, creating the Loch of Strathbeg.
 The Caledonian Mercury newspaper begins publication in Edinburgh.
 Food riots in east coast towns from January to March.

Births 
 31 December – Charles Edward Stuart, Jacobite claimant to the British throne (born, and died 1788, in Rome)

Deaths 
 20 April – George Gordon, 1st Earl of Aberdeen, Lord Chancellor of Scotland (born 1637)
 David Gregory, physician and inventor (born 1625)

The arts

See also 

 Timeline of Scottish history

References 

 
Years of the 18th century in Scotland
Scotland
1720s in Scotland